Kristofer Mayotte is the current head coach for Colorado College. Previously he was an assistant coach at Providence and helped the team win its first National Championship in 2015.

Career
Mayotte began his collegiate career at Union College in 2002. He became the team starting goaltender as a freshman and remained a fixture in net for four years. During Mayotte's tenure, the team didn't see much success, recording just one non-losing season and one playoff win (in 9 attempts). Despite this, Mayotte played well in goal, particularly in his senior season. He was named to the second All-ECAC team and posted a program record for both a season and career in shutouts (both have since been broken).

After the season, Mayotte began his professional career by signing a PTO (Professional Try-Out) contract with the Lowell Lock Monsters. After finishing out the season, Mayotte signed a full contract with the Colorado Avalanche in August and was eventually assigned to their CHL affiliate, the Arizona Sundogs. Mayotte split starting duties with Chris King but neither goalie played particularly well and both were gone after the season. Mayotte ended up with the Fresno Falcons the following season and again shared starting duties. While he was the secondary netminder, Mayotte's numbers did improve and he ended up as the primary goaltender for the Johnstown Chiefs the next season. He played well enough to get two short stints at the AHL level but didn't distinguish himself enough to remain in AAA hockey. After a disappointing year with Johnstown in 2010, Mayotte retired as a player.

He spent the 2010–11 season working as a goaltending coach at Maryland and joined Cornell as a volunteer assistant the following year. In 2012 he got his first full-time position at St. Lawrence. He worked mostly on goaltending an penalty killing for head coach Greg Carvel but left after two seasons to take similar position with Providence. He joined the Friars just in time to help the team go on a surprising run in the 2015 NCAA Tournament and win the championship. Providence's goaltender, Jon Gillies, was an All-American and NCAA Tournament Most Outstanding Player that season.

Mayotte remained at Providence until 2019 when he left to join the coaching staff at Michigan. He helped the Wolverines put themselves in a position to make the NCAA tournament both years but the COVID-19 pandemic prevented Michigan from playing in either 2020 or 2021. After his second year with the Wolverines, Mayotte was named the 15th head coach for Colorado College.

Statistics

Regular season and playoffs

Head coaching record

References

External links

1983 births
Living people
Ice hockey coaches from Pennsylvania
Sportspeople from Pittsburgh
American men's ice hockey goaltenders
Sioux City Musketeers players
Union Dutchmen ice hockey players
San Diego Gulls (ECHL) players
Lowell Lock Monsters players
Arizona Sundogs players
Fresno Falcons players
Johnstown Chiefs players
Hershey Bears players
Bridgeport Sound Tigers players
Adirondack Phantoms players
Colorado College Tigers men's ice hockey coaches
Ice hockey people from Pittsburgh